The Edwin Morgan Poetry Award Award is a Scottish poetry prize awarded biennially for the best unpublished poetry collection by a Scottish poet under the age of 30. The £20,000 prize is one of the largest in the UK and is administered by the Edwin Morgan Trust. When Scottish poet, Edwin Morgan, died in 2010, he bequeathed one million pounds to create a foundation for young Scottish poets. The Edwin Morgan Trust was established in 2012 to carry out Morgan's bequest.

List of winners

See also
Poetry of Scotland
List of poetry awards

References

Scottish literary awards